Lahtan Choudhary  was an Indian politician. He was a Member of Parliament, representing Saharsa, Bihar in the Lok Sabha the lower house of India's Parliament as a member of  the Indian National Congress.

References

India MPs 1962–1967
Lok Sabha members from Bihar

Indian National Congress politicians
2003  deaths